Mount Christmas is a uniform sharp peak,  high, standing  west-southwest of Cape May, in the Nash Range of Antarctica. It was discovered by the British National Antarctic Expedition, 1901–04, and so named because it was the most salient feature in view when the polar party was abreast of it on Christmas Day, December 25, 1902.

References 

Mountains of the Ross Dependency
Shackleton Coast